Daniel Bernhardt (born 21 August 1985) is a German former footballer who played as a goalkeeper.

References 

1985 births
Living people
German footballers
Association football goalkeepers
TSG 1899 Hoffenheim players
VfR Aalen players
2. Bundesliga players
3. Liga players
Regionalliga players
Oberliga (football) players
ASV Durlach players
Footballers from Karlsruhe
21st-century German people